is a Japanese voice actress, DJ, rapper and singer from Okinawa Prefecture who is affiliated with Hibiki. She is a member of the band Raise A Suilen (RAS), and plays the character Chiyu Tamade in the multimedia franchise BanG Dream!. She also portrays Tazusa Andō in Assault Lily and Saki Izumo in D4DJ.

Biography
Tsumugi was born in Kanagawa Prefecture on July 5, 1996, and moved to Okinawa Prefecture after her birth. From kindergarten to fourth grade of elementary school, she attended an international school where she learned to speak English. After graduating from high school, she moved to Tokyo for university and studied in the school's law department.

As a second-year middle school student, she became interested in voice acting after watching a video of voice actress Aya Hirano perform a live dubbing of Haruhi Suzumiya. Her parents initially opposed her decision, prompting her to secretly register for auditions but she was unable to take part as such sessions took place in Tokyo or Fukuoka Prefecture; they eventually gave their support upon being asked again. At university, Tsumugi started auditioning during her first year and became affiliated with the talent agency Hibiki two years later. Among her early roles were Yukimura Yuzuki in Aikatsu Friends! and Fina in Bermuda Triangle: Colorful Pastrale, and she also voiced unnamed characters in shows like We Never Learn and Anima Yell!.

In 2018, Tsumugi was cast for the BanG Dream! music franchise and became the disc jockey for the project's in-universe and real-life band Raise A Suilen; she had no disc jockeying or rapping experience prior to joining the band. She made her concert debut in the band's live performance at Akasaka Blitz on July 17. In October, she and other members of Raise A Suilen made an appearance at CharaExpo USA, later returning for the event's 2019 iteration. Her character, Chiyu Tamade (nicknamed ), debuted in the anime's second season in 2019 before appearing in the game BanG Dream! Girls Band Party! the following year. Created with input provided to the staff in interviews, Chiyu has various similarities with Tsumugi such as fluency in English due to her overseas education, which allows her to mix languages while speaking. Bushiroad founder and BanG Dream! creator Takaaki Kidani regarded Tsumugi's bilingualism, which is featured in RAS songs, as an important asset in the franchise's growth overseas. Alongside RAS member Reo Kurachi, Tsumugi is a host on the franchise-focused variety show Radio RIOT.

Tsumugi joined D4DJ, also a Bushiroad property, in 2019 as Saki Izumo of the unit Photon Maiden. In the project's debut concert on July 20–21, she performed with Photon Maiden on the first day before joining Raise A Suilen for the opening act on the second. As Saki is also a DJ, Tsumugi explained in a 2020 interview with Anime News Network that the character allows her to "[appreciate] the joy of DJing through my role again." Tsumugi and Photon Maiden host the variety program D4DJ Photon Maiden TV.

In 2020, she began playing Tazusa Andō in the mixed-media project Assault Lily.

Personal life
In 2022, she married music composer Yuki Honda.

Filmography

Anime

Video games

Theater

References

External links
 Agency profile 
 

1996 births
BanG Dream!
Bushiroad
Japanese DJs
Japanese women singers
Japanese rappers
Japanese voice actresses
People from Okinawa Prefecture
Living people